The 2007 Penrith Panthers season was the 41st in the club's history. They competed in the 2007 NRL season and finished in last place.

Three-quarter Michael Jennings was named the Panthers' rookie of the year and player of the year.

Ladder

Fixtures

Trial matches

Regular season

Players

Player movements
Gains

Losses

Re-Signings

References

Penrith Panthers seasons
Penrith Panthers